The 19th Legislative Assembly of British Columbia sat from 1937 to 1941. The members were elected in the British Columbia general election held in June 1937. The Liberal Party, led by Thomas Dufferin Pattullo, formed the government. The Conservative Party formed the official opposition.

Norman William Whittaker (Liberal) served as speaker for the assembly.

Members of the 19th General Assembly 
The following members were elected to the assembly in 1937.:

Notes:

Party standings

By-elections 
By-elections were held to replace members for various reasons:

Notes:

Other changes 
Rolf Wallgren Bruhn joins the Conservatives in 1938.
James Lyle Telford expelled from the CCF on June 26, 1939, and becomes an independent.

References 

Political history of British Columbia
Terms of British Columbia Parliaments
1937 establishments in British Columbia
1941 disestablishments in British Columbia
20th century in British Columbia